Forth is one of the seventeen wards used to elect members of the City of Edinburgh Council. Established in 2007 along with the other wards, it currently elects four Councillors. Its territory covers communities in the north of the city between Ferry Road and the coast on the Firth of Forth, including Granton, Newhaven, Pilton, Trinity, Victoria Park and Wardie, some of which historically fell within the boundaries of Leith. A 2017 boundary change caused the loss of the Muirhouse neighbourhood, but housebuilding elsewhere (including various projects in Granton) meant the overall population increased slightly. In 2019, the ward had a population of 31,823.

Councillors

Election Results

2022 Election
2022 City of Edinburgh Council election

2017 Election
2017 City of Edinburgh Council election

2012 Election
2012 City of Edinburgh Council election

2007 Election
2007 City of Edinburgh Council election

  
  
  
  
                                        
   
        
                                                                    
                                        

Councillor Elaine Morris defected from the Liberal Democrats to the Scottish National Party on 21 July 2011.

2008 By-election
A by-election arose following the death of Labour councillor Elizabeth Maginnis on 7 September 2008. The seat was held by Labour's Cammy Day.

References

External links
Listed Buildings in Forth Ward, City of Edinburgh at British Listed Buildings

Wards of Edinburgh